3-Chloropropyl octyl sulfoxide is a chemical compound. It is highly toxic and can cause injury or death upon inhalation, ingestion, or skin exposure.

References

Sulfoxides